Elmore Magazine is an American music publication founded in 2005 by Suzanne Cadgène and Arnie Goodman. With the motto, "Saving American Music," Elmore covers a wide variety of genres, including roots, rhythm and blues, jazz, rock 'n' roll, country, folk and Americana.

Elmore'''s name was inspired by bluesman Elmore James, although Cadgène also explained, "Elmore James was certainly a factor, but Elmore is a funky, American, down-home name. I don't know any 'Sir Elmores.'"

After ten years as a print publication, in July 2014 Elmore transitioned to an online format, supplemented by its monthly e-newsletter, the E-more.Elmore runs interviews and in-depth features concerning American music, breaking music news, extensive reviews of new releases, re-issues, music-related films, books and a wide array of live music shows and festivals across the country, as well as giveaways and contests.

In 2012, Elmore was inducted into the Blues Hall of Fame.

ContentElmore's Reviews section, updated daily, features pieces on both new and reissued albums and live shows, as well as music-related films and books. Reviews contributors have included noteworthy music artists, such as Charlie Musselwhite, Kenny Vance and pianist Dave Keyes. The "Ear Candy" subsection spotlights out-of-left-field releases such as the debut record from 81-year-old Mississippi bluesman Leo "Bud" Welch.

An interview piece, "Influences," pairs two diverse, iconic artists, asking them the same questions about the moments that influenced their careers, and compares their answers. Contrasts abound, including blues guitarist Doyle Bramhall II's revelation that he learned guitar on Lightnin' Hopkins' instrument, which Bramhall's drummer father had; living blues legend Buddy Guy recalled that his first guitar was a homemade acoustic with just two strings. Other "Influences" interviewees have included Vince Gill, Ike Turner, Bo Diddley, Dr. John, Gregg Allman, Merle Haggard, Darius Rucker, Ron Wood, Judy Collins, Pete Seeger, John Mellencamp, Smokey Robinson, Jeff Bridges, Jewel (singer), Alice Cooper, Darlene Love, Carlos Santana, Buddy Guy and David Crosby.

Regular columns include "The Good Seats," a behind-the-scenes look at some of America's most distinctive music venues (like the Sixth & I Synagogue in Washington, D.C.) and "Listen Up," a list-based opinion piece ranking the best of everything in music, from the top places for blues and barbecue to the most interesting theoretical rock 'n' roll dinner guests.Elmore also maintains a calendar of upcoming live show picks and festival previews this includes basic information regarding the dates and the lineups, as well as the best places for food, drink and more.

Other recurring pieces include trivia, fun lists , and "What's In Your Bag?," which takes a peek inside the gig bags of famous musicians, from Booker T. Jones to Alice Cooper. Elmore feature stories take a wide and artist-centric perspective on the state of American music. Several features have been written by noted artists themselves, including Little Feat's Bill Payne and longtime rock photographer Paul Natkin. Other similarly noteworthy feature stories include contributions from artists like Martha Reeves, the Zombies' Rod Argent and the Kinks' Dave Davies sharing their firsthand memories the game-changing year they had in 1964, and acclaimed music photographers like Henry Diltz, Mick Rock, Bob Gruen, Ebet Roberts, Dick Waterman and Danny Clinch taking the readers behind the lens, explaining what makes a great rock photo.

References

 External links 
 Official website
 The Boston Blues Society - An article interviewing Elmore'' publisher, Suzanne Cadgene

2005 establishments in New York City
2014 disestablishments in New York (state)
Bimonthly magazines published in the United States
Music magazines published in the United States
Online magazines published in the United States
Defunct magazines published in the United States
Magazines established in 2005
Magazines disestablished in 2014
Magazines published in New York City
Online magazines with defunct print editions